Nurfitriyana Saiman-Lantang (born March 7, 1962) is a retired Indonesian archer. Together with Lilies Handayani and Kusuma Wardhani she won a team silver medal at the 1988 Olympics, bringing the first ever Olympic medal to Indonesia. She also competed in the individual and team events at the 1992 and 1996 Olympics with the best individual result of ninth place in 1988. In the 1980s, Saiman won multiple medals in individual recurve events at the Southeast Asian Games. After retiring from competitions she worked as a coach and prepared the national archery team for the 2016 Olympics.

In popular culture
Portrayed by Bunga Citra Lestari in the 2016 Indonesian film 3 Srikandi.

References

1962 births
Living people
Indonesian female archers
Olympic archers of Indonesia
Archers at the 1988 Summer Olympics
Archers at the 1992 Summer Olympics
Archers at the 1996 Summer Olympics
Olympic silver medalists for Indonesia
Sportspeople from Jakarta
Olympic medalists in archery
Medalists at the 1988 Summer Olympics
Southeast Asian Games gold medalists for Indonesia
Southeast Asian Games silver medalists for Indonesia
Southeast Asian Games medalists in archery
Competitors at the 1987 Southeast Asian Games
20th-century Indonesian women
21st-century Indonesian women